Urban Grimshaw and the Shed Crew is a non-fiction book by English writer Bernard Hare.  It is an account of Britain's dispossessed youth and inner city wastelands.

Hare was on society's margins, living on a rough estate in Leeds, England and with a liking for drink and drugs – so he knew what life in the underclass was like in 1990s Britain. However, even he was shocked when he met Urban Grimshaw, an illiterate, drug-using 12-year-old. 
"If it's one of the functions of art to take you places and show you things you wouldn't otherwise have access to, then Urban Grimshaw is a masterpiece."

A British drama film, Urban and the Shed Crew starring Richard Armitage and Anna Friel is to be released.

Editions
Hardback 2005, Sceptre  
Paperback 2006, Sceptre

Notes

External links
National Literacy Trust UK author interview
politicsphilosophyandsociety
bernardhare

English non-fiction books
2005 non-fiction books